Paul Udogu is an Anglican bishop in Nigeria: he has been Bishop of Afikpo. since 2010.

Notes

Living people
Anglican bishops of Afikpo
21st-century Anglican bishops in Nigeria
Year of birth missing (living people)